Aşıqlı (also, Ashygly and Voroshilovka) is a village and municipality in the Goygol Rayon of Azerbaijan.  It has a population of 1,831.  The municipality consists of the villages of Aşıqlı and Keşkü.

References 

Populated places in Goygol District